The Korean People's Navy operates along both coastlines from major and minor bases. The Korean People's Navy headquarters is in P'yongyang.

West Sea Fleet

The western fleet has approximately 300 ships.
 Pip'a-got: limited operational and logistical support to patrol craft; also home to some submarines
 Sagot (Sagon-ni): home to Squadron 8
 Ch'o-do: small support base and home to Squadron 9 (fast attack craft)
 Tasa-ri: small naval base
 Haeju: major naval base and ship repair facility close to Demarcation Line
 Kwangyang-ni
 Sunwi-do
 Yomju (Yomju-gun)
 Yongwi-do

East Sea Fleet

The eastern fleet has approximately 470 ships.

 T'oejo-dong: base for patrol boats and 1 frigate
 Wonsan (Munch'on): large maritime complex and HQ for East Fleet
 Ch'aho (Ch'aho-nodongjagu): one of two submarine bases in North Korea
 Ch'angjon: home base for smaller patrol boats
 Mayangdo: operational and logistical support for submarines, anti-submarine craft, and patrol boats; one of 2 submarine bases in North Korea
 Puam-ni: small base for patrol boats and landing craft
 Mugyepo: base for patrol boats, landing craft and frigates
 Rason (Rajin): major naval operations and training centre
 Puam Dong: base for patrol boats and landing craft
 Songjon-Pando: support base for patrol and missile boats; part of the larger Wonsan naval/maritime complex

Some ships are domestically built at the Wonsan and Nampho shipyards. Southern bases on both coasts are used to organize infiltrations into South Korea and Japan.

References

Korean People's Navy
Military installations of North Korea